Zelimkhan Akhmadov ( (1975 – 2002) was the Emir of the Grozny Jamaat during the Second Chechen War.

Biography  

Zelimkhan Akhmadov was born in 1975 in Taldy-Kurgan region of Kazakhstan in a family of deported Chechens.

In 1990, his family returned to Chechnya and settled in the city of Urus-Martan.

In 1994, when the first Chechen war began, Zelimkhan joined the Chechen fighters and fought in the mountains of Urus-Martan district.

After the end of the First Chechen war Zelimkhan and his brothers took control of the city of Urus-Martan.

During the second Chechen War, after the death of his brother Ramzan, he headed the Grozny Jamaat, where he conducted military operations against Russian troops and their allies. 

Died in 2002.

References

External links
Погиб главарь чеченских боевиков Зелимхан Ахмадов // «Ria-Novosti», No.190 от 20 сентября 2002, 15:52

Chechen people
Chechen warlords
People of the Chechen wars
People from Taldykorgan
1975 births
2002 deaths
Gendargenoy